Aleksandr Vasilyevich Zhirov (12 September 1958 – 18 May 1983) was a Soviet alpine skier.

He competed at the 1980 Winter Olympics in the slalom and giant slalom and finished ninth in the latter event.

He won four Alpine Skiing World Cup races in March 1981 and finished second in the 1981 giant slalom world cup. Two years later he died in a car accident.

World Cup victories

References 

1958 births
1983 deaths
Soviet male alpine skiers
Road incident deaths in the Soviet Union
Olympic alpine skiers of the Soviet Union
Alpine skiers at the 1980 Winter Olympics
Road incident deaths in Russia
Sportspeople from Moscow Oblast